"Strange Fruit" is a song written and composed by Abel Meeropol (under his pseudonym Lewis Allan) and recorded by Billie Holiday in 1939. The lyrics were drawn from a poem by Meeropol published in 1937. The song protests the lynching of Black Americans with lyrics that compare the victims to the fruit of trees. Such lynchings had reached a peak in the Southern United States at the turn of the 20th century and the great majority of victims were black. The song has been called "a declaration" and "the beginning of the civil rights movement".

Meeropol set his lyrics to music with his wife and the singer Laura Duncan and performed it as a protest song in New York City venues in the late 1930s, including Madison Square Garden. Holiday's version was inducted into the Grammy Hall of Fame in 1978. It was also included in the "Songs of the Century" list of the Recording Industry of America and the National Endowment for the Arts.

In 2002, "Strange Fruit" was selected for preservation in the National Recording Registry by the Library of Congress as being "culturally, historically or aesthetically significant".

Poem and song

"Strange Fruit" originated as a poem written by the Jewish-American writer, teacher and songwriter Abel Meeropol, under his pseudonym Lewis Allan, as a protest against lynchings. In the poem, Meeropol expressed his horror at lynchings, inspired by Lawrence Beitler's photograph of the 1930 lynching of Thomas Shipp and Abram Smith in Marion, Indiana.

Meeropol published the poem under the title "Bitter Fruit" in January 1937 in The New York Teacher, a union magazine of the Teachers Union. Though Meeropol had asked others (notably Earl Robinson) to set his poems to music, he set "Strange Fruit" to music himself. First performed by Meeropol's wife and their friends in social contexts, his protest song gained a certain success in and around New York. Meeropol, his wife, and the Black vocalist Laura Duncan performed it at Madison Square Garden.

Billie Holiday's performances and recordings
One version of events claims that Barney Josephson, the founder of Café Society in Greenwich Village, New York's first integrated nightclub, heard the song and introduced it to Billie Holiday. Other reports say that Robert Gordon, who was directing Holiday's show at Café Society, heard the song at Madison Square Garden and introduced it to her. Holiday first performed the song at Café Society in 1939. She said that singing it made her fearful of retaliation but, because its imagery reminded her of her father, she continued to sing the piece, making it a regular part of her live performances. Because of the power of the song, Josephson drew up some rules: Holiday would close with it; the waiters would stop all service in advance; the room would be in darkness except for a spotlight on Holiday's face; and there would be no encore. During the musical introduction to the song, Holiday stood with her eyes closed, as if she were evoking a prayer.

Holiday approached her recording label, Columbia, about the song, but the company feared reaction by record retailers in the South, as well as negative reaction from affiliates of its co-owned radio network, CBS. When Holiday's producer John Hammond also refused to record it, she turned to her friend Milt Gabler, owner of the Commodore label. Holiday sang "Strange Fruit" for him a cappella, and moved him to tears. Columbia gave Holiday a one-session release from her contract so she could record it; Frankie Newton's eight-piece Café Society Band was used for the session. Because Gabler worried the song was too short, he asked pianist Sonny White to improvise an introduction. On the recording, Holiday starts singing after 70 seconds. It was recorded on April 20, 1939. Gabler worked out a special arrangement with Vocalion Records to record and distribute the song.

Holiday recorded two major sessions of the song at Commodore, one in 1939 and one in 1944. The song was highly regarded; the 1939 recording eventually sold a million copies, in time becoming Holiday's biggest-selling recording.

In her 1956 autobiography, Lady Sings the Blues, Holiday suggested that she, together with Meeropol, her accompanist Sonny White, and arranger Danny Mendelsohn, set the poem to music. The writers David Margolick and Hilton Als dismissed that claim in their work Strange Fruit: The Biography of a Song, writing that hers was "an account that may set a record for most misinformation per column inch". When challenged, Holiday—whose autobiography had been ghostwritten by William Dufty—claimed, "I ain't never read that book."

Holiday was so well known for her rendition of "Strange Fruit" that "she crafted a relationship to the song that would make them inseparable". Holiday's 1939 version of the song was included in the National Recording Registry on January 27, 2003.

In October 1939, Samuel Grafton of the New York Post said of "Strange Fruit", "If the anger of the exploited ever mounts high enough in the South, it now has its Marseillaise." In an attempt to have a two-thirds majority in the Senate that would break the filibusters by southern senators, anti-racism activists were encouraged to mail copies of "Strange Fruit" to their senators.

Notable covers
Notable cover versions of this song include Nina Simone, René Marie, Jeff Buckley, Siouxsie and the Banshees, Dee Dee Bridgewater, Josh White, UB40, Bettye LaVette, Terry Blade and Edward W. Hardy. Simone recorded the song in 1965, a recording described by journalist David Margolick in The New York Times as featuring a "plain and unsentimental voice". René Marie's rendition was coupled with the Confederate anthem "Dixie", making for an "uncomfortable juxtaposition". Journalist Lara Pellegrinelli wrote that Jeff Buckley while singing it "seems to meditate on the meaning of humanity the way Walt Whitman did, considering all of its glorious and horrifying possibilities". LA Times noted that Siouxsie and the Banshees's version contained "a solemn string section behind the vocals" and "a bridge of New Orleans funeral-march jazz" which enhanced the singer's "evocative interpretation". The group's rendition was selected by the Mojo staff to be included on the compilation Music Is Love: 15 Tracks That Changed The World .

Awards and honors
 1999: Time magazine named "Strange Fruit" as "Best Song of the Century" in its issue dated December 31, 1999.
 2002: The Library of Congress honored the song as one of 50 recordings chosen that year to add to the National Recording Registry.
 2005: The Atlanta Journal-Constitution listed the song as Number One on "100 Songs of the South".
 2010: The New Statesman listed it as one of the "Top 20 Political Songs".
 2021: Rolling Stone listed as the 21st best song on their "Top 500 Best Songs of All Time".

Books
 Lillian Smith's novel Strange Fruit (1944) was said to have been inspired by Holiday's version of the song.
 Patrick Phillips' non-fiction book Blood at the Root (2016) takes its name from words in the song.

Bibliography
 
 
 
  Autobiography.

References

External links
 "Strange Fruit", 78rpm Record, Internet Archive
 Film of Billie Holiday singing "Strange Fruit" 1959
 "Strange Fruit", Independent Lens, PBS
 Strange Fruit, California Newsreel, documentary, 2002
 "Strange Fruit", Shmoop, analysis of lyrics, historical and literary allusions - student & teaching guide
 
 BBC Radio 4 - Soul Music, Series 17, Strange Fruit
 "Strange Fruit: A protest song with enduring relevance"

1939 songs
Billie Holiday songs
Songs about black people
Songs about death
Songs about trees
Lynching in the United States
History of African-American civil rights
Songs against racism and xenophobia
Songs based on American history
Songs based on poems
United States National Recording Registry recordings
Works originally published in American magazines
Protest songs
Songs about the American South